The 1978 Masters (also known as the 1978 Colgate-Palmolive Masters for sponsorship reasons) was held in Madison Square Garden, New York City, United States between 10 January and 14 January 1979.  It was the year-end championship of the 1978 Grand Prix circuit tour.

Finals

Singles

 John McEnroe defeated  Arthur Ashe, 6–7, 6–3, 7–5.

Doubles

 John McEnroe /  Peter Fleming defeated  Tom Okker /  Wojtek Fibak 6-4, 6-2, 6-4.

References

 

 
Grand Prix tennis circuit year-end championships
Tennis tournaments in the United States
Colgate-Palmolive Masters
Colgate-Palmolive Masters
Colgate-Palmolive Masters